The Liyutan Dam is a dam in Sanyi Township, Miaoli County, Taiwan.

History
The dam was initially constructed in July 1985 and was opened in November 1992.

Technical specifications
The dam has a total capacity of 126,120,000 m3 and an effective capacity of 122,710,000 m3. Its water surface spans over an area of 4.32 km2 with a maximum depth of 300 m. The dam forms the Liyutan Reservoir and discharges its water to Da'an River. The dam supplies water to the public in Taichung City and Miaoli County, as well as 4,209 hectares of irrigation area.

Transportation
The dam is accessible east from Tai'an Station of Taiwan Railways.

See also
 List of dams and reservoirs in Taiwan

References

1992 establishments in Taiwan
Dams in Miaoli County
Dams completed in 1992